Gromford is a small village in Suffolk, England, just north of Snape along the Gromford Lane.

Notable persons
 Birthplace of Ipswich Town footballer Ted Phillips.

References

Villages in Suffolk